Peter Baláž may refer to:

 Peter Baláž (Esperantist) (born 1979), Slovak Esperantist and editor
 Peter Baláž (boxer) (born 1974), Slovak boxer